Lake Marcapomacocha (possibly from Quechua marka village, puma cougar, puma, qucha lake) is a lake in Peru. It is located in the Junín Region, Yauli Province, Marcapomacocha District. Lake Marcapomacocha lies south of Lake Marcacocha and east of Lake Antacota.

Ecology 
The area where Lake Marcapomacocha is located is important for the breeding of the andean goose, the crested duck and the giant coot. Bogs in the area are home to the rare diademed sandpiper-plover. The rainbow trout has become a naturalized species in the lake.

Environmental threats 
The most important threats to the lake are the excessive hunting and the manipulation of water levels.

See also
 Aququcha
List of lakes in Peru

References

Marcapomacocha
Marcapomacocha